Sam Sanna (born 8 March 1999) is a French professional footballer who plays as a midfielder for  club Laval on loan from Toulouse.

Career
A youth product of Toulouse, Sanna signed his first professional contract on 14 June 2020. He made his professional debut with Toulouse in a 5–3 Ligue 2 loss to Grenoble on 29 August 2020.

On 29 June 2022, Sanna moved on loan to Laval.

Honours 
Toulouse

 Ligue 2: 2021–22

References

External links
 
 
 

1999 births
Living people
People from Lourdes
Association football midfielders
French footballers
French people of Italian descent
Toulouse FC players
Stade Lavallois players
Ligue 2 players
Championnat National 3 players
Sportspeople from Hautes-Pyrénées
Footballers from Occitania (administrative region)